The Barnard Block is a historic commercial block at 10–16 Main Street in the center of Andover, Massachusetts.  The two story brick and stone building was built in 1910 for Henry Barnard, son and business partner of Jacob W. Barnard, a successful local shoemaker.  This building was one of a number of family investments.  It features elaborate Colonial Revival detailing, include creative use of multicolored stonework, Palladian windows, and a central triangular pediment on the Main Street facade.

The building was listed on the National Register of Historic Places in 1982.

See also
National Register of Historic Places listings in Andover, Massachusetts
National Register of Historic Places listings in Essex County, Massachusetts

References

Commercial blocks on the National Register of Historic Places in Massachusetts
Buildings and structures in Andover, Massachusetts
National Register of Historic Places in Andover, Massachusetts
1910 establishments in Massachusetts